The Justices of the Peace Act 1361 (34 Edw 3 c 1) is an Act of the Parliament of England. The Act, although amended, remains enforceable in England and Wales in 2022.

Background 
Maintaining the peace had long been a concern of society and part of the common law, but that aspect of the common law was enshrined into statute by the enactment of the Justices of the Peace Act 1361. The primary reason for the legislation was due to concerns about soldiers returning from the war in France, and the potential of them not reintegrating back into their communities as peaceful citizens.

The Act defined who was eligible to become a justice of the peace, their duties and their powers. It detailed that each county assigned a lord and three of four worthy people to become justices of the peace. The role of a justice of the peace was to deal with  'offenders, rioters, and all other barators'. It empowered them to apprehend, arrest, and punish them, in accordance with the 'law and customs of the realm'.

The Act empowered a justice of the peace to imprison offenders, bind them over with sureties to be of good behaviour towards the Crown and people of the realm, and set fines, specifying the fine should be 'reasonable and just' according to the circumstances of the offence.

Ireland - the Land War
The Act applied to Ireland, but was not of much importance until the so-called Land War of 1879-1882, a highly organised campaign for tenant's rights. Lay magistrates, anxious to find a legal device to suppress the mass meetings which were a key part of the campaign, sought legal advice from the central government. The Crown's legal advice was that they should invoke the power in the 1361 Act to bind offenders over to keep the peace. The advice was controversial due to the reference in the Act to "rioters": it was argued that since the meetings were largely peaceful they could not possibly come within the definition of riot. Due to these concerns, widespread use of the Act soon ceased.

The role of justice of the peace 

The role of justice of the peace, now often known as magistrates, originates from the Justices of the Peace Act 1361. The powers and responsibilities of them have altered over their long history. A justice of the peace held powerful sentencing powers such as hanging, whipping and penal transportation. Justices of the peace gained an array of duties such as dealing with local infrastructures such as roads and bridges, and regulating weights and measures used by traders. Many of the duties of justice of the peace, due to the development of local administration, were transferred to local government authorities.

, about 21,500 volunteers service as a justice of the peace in magistrates' courts. Typically, they deal with low-level offences and crimes, and deal with 95% of criminal cases taken to court. The maximum sentence a magistrates' court can impose is six months imprisonment for a single offence, or 12 months imprisonment for multiple offences, and an unlimited fine. A magistrates' court is the starting point for the majority of the most serious types of crime that are later committed to the Crown Court. An appeal court against a decision made in a Magistrate Court is the appeal is heard by two Justice of the Peace sitting with a Judge.

In addition to criminal cases, magistrates also hear youth court cases, involving people under 18 years old, civil cases, such as non-payment of Council Tax, and sit in family proceedings courts.

Breach of the peace 
The Justices of the Peace Act 1361 permitted a justice of the peace to bind over people who disturbed the peace to provide recognisance to ensure their future good conduct.

A breach of the peace can occur at any place, including private houses. The modern definition of a breach of the peace is:

Any person can make an arrest or a preventative measure when,

 "a breach of the peace occurs in his presence, or
 he reasonably believes that such a breach is about to occur, whether or not there has yet been a breach'

Binding over orders originate from the Justices of the Peace Act 1361.  A person can be taken to court to be bound over, formally known as being bound over to keep the peace, after 2013, the specifics of what a person cannot do is tighter and clearly defined on the bind-over order. A breach of the peace is a civil law case, although it uses the criminal standard of proof 'beyond reasonable doubt'. After 7 October 2013, the Criminal Practice Direction [2013] EWCA Crim 1631 contain the full court procedures for Binding over orders for any matter, including breach of the peace.

A person must agree to be bound over. In a magistrates' court, a person refusing to be bound over is dealt with under the Magistrates' Courts Act 1980, and liable to imprisonment up to a maximum of six months or until they comply with the order. In the Crown Court, such a refusal is dealt with as contempt of court.

See also
Binding over
Breach of the peace
Halsbury's Statutes,
Magistrate (England and Wales)
Justices of the Peace Act

References

External links
The Justices of the Peace Act 1361 as originally passed.
The Justices of the Peace Act 1361, as amended from the National Archives.

Acts of the Parliament of England
1360s in law
1361 in England